Knickerbocker Bicycle Bridge (officially the Willie Knickerbocker Bridge) is a bridge across the Willamette River in Eugene, Oregon, United States. The bridge was dedicated in 1980.

The bridge was originally constructed to carry a Eugene Water & Electric Board water main for $330,000.  The city and county added the bridge deck, rails, and approaches for $110,000.

The bridge is named for Willie Knickerbocker (1868–1960), "The Father of Bicycling in Eugene".

See also
 List of crossings of the Willamette River
Whilamut Passage Bridge—nearby bridge running parallel to the Knickerbocker Bicycle Bridge over the Millrace

References

External links
 Willie Knickerbocker has a lot to teach us about getting there by Steve McQuiddy for The Register-Guard

1980 establishments in Oregon
Bike paths in Oregon
Buildings and structures in Eugene, Oregon
Bridges completed in 1980
Bridges in Lane County, Oregon
Bridges over the Willamette River
Concrete bridges in the United States
Pedestrian bridges in Oregon
Transportation in Eugene, Oregon